Leopardi is an Italian word meaning "Leopards". It is also a surname of Italian origin. It may refer to:

People
Giacomo Leopardi and family
Giacomo Leopardi (1798–1837), Italian poet, essayist, philosopher, and philologist.
Adelaide Antici Leopardi (1778–1857), mother of Giacomo.
Monaldo Leopardi (1776–1847), Italian philosopher and writer, father of Giacomo.
Paolina Leopardi (1800–1869), sister of Giacomo.

Other Leopardi
 Alessandro Leopardi (14..-1522/23), Italian sculptor.
 Chauncey Leopardi (b. 1981), American television and film actor.
 Eric Christopher Leopardi (b. 1988), American television producer and director.
 Giacomo Leopardi (politician) (b. 1928), Italian politician.
 Marcello Leopardi (1750 ca.-1795), Italian painter.
 Orlando Leopardi (1902-19..), Italian boxer.
 Pier Silvestro Leopardi (1797-1870), Italian politician and patriot.
 Roberto Leopardi (b. 1933), Uruguayan footballer.

Other
 Leopardi (film), a 2014 Italian film
 Leopardi (ferry), Italian ferry active between 1978 and 1994.
 Leopardi (Torre del Greco), Italian civil parish of Torre del Greco (NA),  Campania
 8081 Leopardi, main-belt asteroid
 Leopardi (crater), a crater on Mercury

See also

Leopard (disambiguation)
Leopards (disambiguation)

Italian-language surnames